Leo Vincent Rankin (8 October 1879 – 10 May 1917) was a former Australian rules footballer who played with Melbourne in the Victorian Football League (VFL).

Family
The son of John Rankin (1844–1916), and Mary Rankin, née Donoghue, Leo Vincent Rankin was born at East Melbourne, Australia on 8 October 1879.

Education
He attended Xavier College.

Football
He played in one match for Melbourne, against Carlton, on 9 September 1899.

Along with two other "single game players" — Joe Finlay and Arthur Sinclair — he was used to make up the numbers, when regular players Jack Davidson, Maurie Herring,  Eddie Sholl, Dick Wardill, and Alf Wood were all unavailable.

Military service
He enlisted for service in the First AIF on 8 December 1915, and served overseas in the 55th Battalion.

Death 
He died (of hepatitis) on 10 May 1917 at the Military Hospital in Wareham, Dorset, United Kingdom, and was buried in the military cemetery of the Lady St Mary Church, Wareham.

See also
 List of Victorian Football League players who died on active service

Notes

References
 
 World War One Nominal Roll: Private Leo Vincent Rankin (1718), collection of the Australian War Memorial.
 World War One Embarkation Roll: Private Leo Vincent Rankin (1718), collection of the Australian War Memorial.
 World War One Service Record: Private Leo Vincent Rankin (1718), National Archives of Australia.
 Australian Red Cross Society Wounded and Missing Enquiry Bureau files, 1914–18 War: 1DRL/0428: 1718 Private Leo Vincent Rankin: 55th Battalion, collection of the Australian War Memorial.
 304th Casualty List: New South Wales: Died of Illness, The Sydney Morning Herald, (Tuesday, 29 May 1917), p.8.
 Private Leo Vincent Rankin (1718), Commonwealth War Graves Commission.
 Roll of Honour: Private Leo Vincent Rankin (1718), Australian War Memorial.
 Roll of Honour Circular: Private Leo Vincent Rankin (1718), Australian War Memorial.

External links 
 
 
 Leo Rankin, at Demonwiki.

1879 births
1917 deaths
People educated at Xavier College
Australian rules footballers from Victoria (Australia)
Melbourne Football Club players
Australian military personnel killed in World War I
Deaths from hepatitis
Military personnel from Melbourne
Australian Army soldiers